Archduke Joseph may refer to:
 Archduke Joseph, Palatine of Hungary (1776–1847), Palatine of Hungary from 1796 to 1847
 Archduke Joseph Árpád of Austria (1933–2017)
 Archduke Joseph August of Austria (1872–1962), regent of Hungary in August 1919
 Archduke Joseph Ferdinand of Austria (1872–1942), titular Grand Duke of Tuscany from 1908 to 1921
 Archduke Joseph Francis of Austria (1895–1957)
 Archduke Joseph Franz of Austria (1799–1807)
 Archduke Joseph Karl of Austria (1833–1905)
 Archduke Joseph (diamond)